New Tales of Gisaeng (also known as New Gisaeng Story) is a 2011 South Korean television series starring Im Soo-hyang, Sung Hoon, and Han Hye-rin. Written by Im Sung-han and directed by Son Moon-kwon, it aired on SBS from January 23 to July 17, 2011 on Saturdays and Sundays at 21:45 for 52 episodes. It is based on Lee Hyun-su's novel of the same name.

Plot
"Gisaeng" was the Korean equivalent of a geisha or courtesan knowledgeable in poetry, dance, music, culture and politics, who entertained noblemen and royalty of the Joseon Dynasty. This series explores the premise that gisaeng still existed in modern-day Korea.

Dan Sa-ran (Im Soo-hyang) lost her mother at a young age, and never quite got along with her stepmother and stepsister. Despite her humble background, she carries herself with pride and grace, majoring in classical dance during college. Drawing the attention of Buyonggak's head gisaeng with her dancing talent and classic beauty, Sa-ran enters Korea's sole traditional gisaeng house, an exclusive establishment that serves only VIP guests. Ah Da-mo (Sung Hoon) is a cocky second-generation chaebol with his own set of daddy issues. He can't be bothered to give any woman the time of day... until he meets Sa-ran.

Cast

Main characters
 Im Soo-hyang as Dan Sa-ran 
 Sung Hoon as Ah Da-mo
 Han Hye-rin as Geum Ra-ra
 Kim Bo-yeon as Oh Hwa-ran
 Kim Hyeseon as Han Soon-deok
 Jung Han-bi as young Soon-deok

Supporting characters
Dan family
 Baek Ok-dam as Dan Gong-joo
 Kim Joo-young as Dan Chul-soo
 Lee Sook as Ji Hwa-ja

Geum family
 Han Jin-hee as Geum Eo-san
 Park Jin as young Eo-san
 Seo Woo-rim as Lee Hong-ah
 Lee Jong-nam as Jang Joo-hee
 Lee Dong-joon as Geum Kang-san
 Lee Dae-ro as Geum Shi-jo
 Lee Sang-mi as Shin Hyo-ri

Ah family
 Im Hyuk as Ah Soo-ra
 Kim Hye-jung as Cha Ra-ri
 Ahn Young-joo as Park Ae-ja

Buyonggak
 Lee Mae-ri as Lee Do-hwa
 Choi Sun-ja as Hwa-ran's mother
 Park Joon-myun as Noh Eun-ja
 Seo Dong-soo as Ma Dan-se
 Song Dae-kwan as Seo Saeng-kang
 Oh Ki-chan as Oh Bong-yi
 Kang Cho-hee as Han Song-yi
 Kim Yul as Baek Soo-jung
 Seol Yoon as Jang Soo-jin
 Yoon Ji-eun as Song Hye-eun
 Kim Eun-sun as Ye-rang
 Lee Sun-ah as Lee Ji-hyang
 Oh Ji-yeon as Kim-sshi
 Ha Na-kyung

Extended cast
 Jeon Ji-hoo as Son-ja
 Jin Ye-sol as Jin Joo-ah
 Lee Soo-jin as Sung Ah-mi
 Park Yoon-jae as Oh Jin-ahm
 Kim Ho-chang as Yoo Tae-young
 Michael Blunck as Kyle
 Shin Goo as Master Joong-bong
 Jun Sung-hwan as Master Jung-do
 Lee Hyo-jung as Ma Yi-joon (CEO Joon Entertainment) The Midas
 Kim Joon-hyung as Do-suk
 Son Ga-young as Choi Young-mim
 Won Jong-rye as Young-nim's mother
 Kim Sun-il as Min-jae
 Min Joon-hyun as manager

Ratings

Awards and nominations

International broadcast
It aired in Japan on cable channel KNTV from September 9, 2012 to March 3, 2013, with reruns on cable channel BS Japan beginning February 20, 2013.
In 2015, Hong Kong's HKTV also played this drama.

References

External links
  
 
 

Seoul Broadcasting System television dramas
2011 South Korean television series debuts
2011 South Korean television series endings
Korean-language television shows
South Korean romance television series
Television shows based on South Korean novels